CUMYL-NBMINACA (SGT-152, Cumyl-BC[2.2.1]HpMINACA) is a synthetic cannabinoid compound first reported in a 2013 patent, but not identified as a designer drug until 2021, being identified by a forensic laboratory in Germany in February 2021.

See also
 CUMYL-BC-HPMEGACLONE-221

References 

Cannabinoids
Indazolecarboxamides